Dizzy Gillespie Jam is a live album by trumpeter Dizzy Gillespie recorded at the Montreux Jazz Festival in 1977 and released on the Pablo label.

Reception
The Allmusic review stated that "few fireworks occur in what should have been an explosive encounter".

Track listing
 "Girl of My Dreams" (Sunny Clapp) - 13:56 
 "Get Happy" (Harold Arlen, Ted Koehler) - 7:51 
 "Medley: Once in a While/But Beautiful/Here's That Rainy Day" (Michael Edwards, Bud Green/Johnny Burke, James Van Heusen/Burke, Van Huesen) - 13:03 
 "The Champ" (Dizzy Gillespie) - 9:34

Personnel
Dizzy Gillespie, John Faddis - trumpet
Milt Jackson - vibraphone
Monty Alexander - piano
Ray Brown - bass
Jimmie Smith - drums

References 

Pablo Records albums
Dizzy Gillespie albums
Albums produced by Norman Granz
Albums recorded at the Montreux Jazz Festival
1977 albums